Halton railway station served the village of Halton in Lancashire, England. It closed in 1966, but the station building and part of one platform survive beside the cycle path along the disused line.

In reference books the station is sometimes referred to as Halton (Lancs) to distinguish it from another Halton railway station in Cheshire.

History

The station was opened on 17 November 1849 by the "little" North Western Railway. It was linked to Halton village by a railway-owned narrow toll bridge across the River Lune. A rebuilt version of the bridge is still in use, free of charge.

The original timber station was destroyed by fire on 3 April 1907. A spark from the engine of a passing Heysham– boat train set fire to a wagon of oil drums by the goods shed. The fire brigade were unable to cross the narrow bridge and it was left to a special trainload of railway workers from Lancaster to pass buckets of water from the river. The station was rebuilt in brick and timber and the building survives to this day, used as storage by Lancaster University Rowing Club, with a public car park occupying the former track bed.

No other station survives. Cyclists and walkers can travel along the former line in either direction. Beneath the trackbed, east of the station, can be heard running water that is extracted from the river to an underground pumping station in Quernmore Park.

Notes

References

 
 Suggitt, G. (2003, revised 2004) Lost Railways of Lancashire, Countryside Books, Newbury, 
 Vinter, J. (1990), Railway Walks: LMS, Alan Sutton Publishing Ltd, Stroud,

External links

 "Millennium Park Cycle Route & Walk", Leeds–Lancaster–Morecambe Railway website, accessed 19 December 2008
 "Disused Stations Site Record — Halton (near Lancaster)", accessed 19 December 2008

Disused railway stations in Lancaster
Railway stations in Great Britain opened in 1849
Railway stations in Great Britain closed in 1966
Former Midland Railway stations
Beeching closures in England
1849 establishments in England